Georgian Grande Horse is a new horse breed being developed from crossbreeding the American Saddlebred with the Friesian horse and assorted draft horse breeds. The aim of the breeding is to create a Saddlebred-like horse that adds the best qualities of heavier breeds.  One goal of the breed registry is to recreate a historic type of Saddlebred which was common prior to the 20th century, but that has been less emphasized in modern times.

History

The first attempts to create a new, heavier Saddlebred-type breed were made in the 1970s by George Wagner Jr, in Piketon, Ohio. His ambition was to recreate the stockier, sturdier look of the Saddlebred of older times, such as the animals used as cavalry mounts during the American Civil War. He considered this the original type of the Saddlebred horse instead of the prevailing modern, lighter type. Wagner's breeding succeeded in creating horses of the desired type, and the breed was named after him as "George's great horse". The breed association International Georgian Grande Horse Registry was founded in 1994, and was later accepted as member under the United States Dressage Federation All Breeds Council and the American Horse Council.  While not a national recognized breed affiliate with the USEF, Georgian Grandes may compete in any open all-breed USEF division, and a Georgian Grande  that is also a Friesian cross with 50% or more Friesian breeding and one purebred Friesian parent may compete in part-bred Friesian classes.

Breeding

The goal of the breeding is to combine the refinement of the Saddlebred and the temperament of heavier breeds, and to create a "baroque"  style of horse that is suited for multiple equestrian and driving purposes.

To qualify for registration with the International Georgian Grande Horse Registry, the horse must either be of registered Georgian Grande Horse parents, or have a blended bloodline of American Saddlebred and any of the following: Friesian horse, Clydesdale horse, Percheron, Shire horse, Irish Draught or Belgian draft horse. Drum Horses and Gypsy Vanner horses are accepted as an influence if they are registered with their own breed registry and have a proven pedigree. No non-draft horse influence other than the Saddlebred is accepted. A Georgian Grande Horse is expected to have at least 25% but no more than 75% of Saddlebred influence in its pedigree.

Conformation and qualities
All colors of coat and eyes are accepted. The desired overall impression is a horse that is tall, strong-boned and of striking appearance. The desired character of a Georgian Grande Horse is alert and intelligent but calm. The horse should be easy to train and very cooperative. A Georgian Grande Horse is not considered mature until the age of six years.

The breed standard describes the forehead as being broad, and the eyes large and set wide apart. The profile should be straight or slightly concave, with a delicate muzzle and large nostrils. The ears should have a good shape and express the desired alert character of the horse. The neck is long, arched and well-muscled, flowing into well-defined withers, and a back that is level and relatively short. The shoulders are deep and sloping to allow for good movement.  The croup should be slightly sloping rather than level. The hips should be wide and round.   The legs are properly angled and well-set, and their conformation should allow the animal to be good at jumping. The joints should be large, flat and clean. The legs are desired to be thick with good bone; the circumference of the cannon of a mature horse, measured just below the knee, should be  at the minimum, and a larger circumference is desirable. The hooves should be large and in proportion to the size of the horse.

The trot should have great lift and impulsion, with good extension. The horse should move its hocks deep under its body. The canter should be balanced and round, and the walk should be very energetic.  Gaits comprise 50% of the scoring in shows.

When grooming a Georgia Grande, the mane and tail should normally be kept at full length, though the mane may be pulled for hunting or jumping purposes. The tail is kept natural, and is not to be docked or cut. Feathering on the legs is acceptable, though the legs may also be clipped.

References

Horse breeds
Horse breeds originating in the United States